Xenoturbella churro is a marine, benthic, deep-water worm-like species that belongs to the genus Xenoturbella. It was discovered in eastern Pacific Ocean by a group of Californian and Australian scientists. The species was described in 2016 from a single specimen.

X. churro shares morphological similarities with other species of the genus Xenoturbella, and is known for lacking respiratory, circulatory and an excretory system.

Description 
The etymology of the species name refers to the resemblance with churro, a fried-dough pastry.

The body wall displays several furrows: on the circumference, on the side, and four deep, longitudinal, dorsal ones. The longitudinal orientation involves a rounded anterior end, while the posterior end sharply reduces in thickness. The mouth is orientated ventrally, halfway between the anterior end and the ring furrow. The live specimen exhibited an epidermal ventral glandular network branching over two-thirds of the ventral surface. Gametes are present dorsally and ventrally in the body wall. Tissues contain exogenous DNA corresponding to a bivalve mollusk, the vesicomyid Calyptogena pacifica.

Phylogeny 
Comparison of mitochondrial DNA and protein sequences showed that the species X. churro is the sister group to X. profunda. In turn, these two species share evolutionary affinities with X. monstrosa into a clade of 'deep-water' taxa.

References 

Xenacoelomorpha
Animals described in 2016